Adonis are a Lebanese indie band formed in 2011.

The band was founded by Anthony Khoury (vocals) and Joey Abu Jawdeh (guitar) in Beirut. It included the former's brother, Fabio Khoury (bass), and Nicola Hakim (drums). Gio Fikany (bass) joined after Fabio left and moved to Switzerland.

In 2021, Adonis released their fifth studio album, A'da.

Discography 

 Daw El Baladiyyi (2011)
Men Shou Bteshki Beirut (2013)
Nour (2017)
12 Sa'a (2019)
A'da (2021)
 Hadis El Layl (2022)

References

External links 
 Adonis band... The story of 4 Lebanese musicians

Lebanese musical groups